Mehmet Ali Ulaman (born 3 April 2003) is a Turkish professional footballer who plays as a winger  for Denizlispor.

Professional career
Yıldırım is a youth product of Arabayatağıspor, and Denizlispor. He signed his first professional contract with Denizlispor on 26 January 2021. He made his professional debut with Denizlispor in a 5–1 Süper Lig loss to Fatih Karagümrük on 15 March 2021.

References

External links
 
 

2003 births
Living people
Sportspeople from Denizli
Turkish footballers
Denizlispor footballers
Süper Lig players
Association football wingers